Bonkita Airport  is an airstrip serving Bonkita, a village on the Lukenie River in the Mai-Ndombe Province, Democratic Republic of the Congo.

See also

Transport in Democratic Republic of the Congo
List of airports in Democratic Republic of the Congo

References

External links
OpenStreetMap - Bonkita Airport
OurAirports - Bonkita Airport

Airports in Mai-Ndombe Province